Furongqiao Township is an rural township in Sangzhi County, Zhangjiajie, Hunan Province, China.

Administrative division
The township is divided into 13 villages, the following areas: Gaoyang Village, Fujianpo Village, Tuojiagang Village, Hai'eryu Village, Liaoping Village, Wawuping Village, Yinxing Village, Furongqiao Village, Meijiaqiao Village, Hequn Village, Xingwang Village, Dazhuangping Village, and Hujiayu Village (高杨村、福建坡村、庹家岗村、海儿峪村、廖坪村、瓦屋坪村、银星村、芙蓉桥村、梅家桥村、鹤群村、兴旺村、大庄坪村、胡家峪村).

References

External links

Divisions of Sangzhi County
Ethnic townships of the People's Republic of China